Ballytarsna, County Tipperary, may refer to:

Ballytarsna, Clonmel, County Tipperary
Ballytarsna, Cashel, County Tipperary